LeSean Thomas (born 1975) is an American television animation producer, director, animator, comic book artist, writer, character designer, and storyboard artist, based in Meguro, Tokyo.

His recent, notable projects include the TV series Black Dynamite for Adult Swim, The Legend of Korra for Nickelodeon, Aaron McGruder's The Boondocks for Sony Pictures Television, Children of Ether on Crunchyroll, and the Netflix anime original series Cannon Busters and Yasuke.

Career
Thomas' contributions as supervising character designer and co-director on seasons 1 and 2 of Adult Swim's animated series The Boondocks, helped propel the show to be nominated for an NAACP Image Award for Outstanding Comedy Series and win the honorary Peabody Award.

His early production credits include character designer, layout and key animator on Showtime's web series WhirlGirl, assistant animator for Lizzie McGuire and storyboard artist for various shows such as Kim Possible on Disney Channel, Ben 10: Alien Force for Cartoon Network, The Batman, Batman: The Brave and the Bold and Green Lantern: First Flight, as well as supervising character designer for Superman/Batman: Public Enemies for Warner Bros. Animation.

Thomas landed his first production deal with the late George Jackson's UBO Network, where he created an animated online series called BattleSeed. Thomas wrote, produced and directed the series, which was presented at the New York Anime Film Festival in 2000. He produced a BattleSeed original animated trailer which aired in theaters as a promotional trailer for the Sci-Fi Channel. Thomas also provided production development for the action adventure movie UltraViolet.

Thomas is also a comic book artist, with work on such titles as Arkanium, and Teenage Mutant Ninja Turtles. His books include sketch bible Nervous Breakdowns: The Art of LeSean Thomas Vol. 1. He has also released the artbook  Midnight Marauder: The Art of LeSean Thomas Vol. 2 and Cannon Busters, a creator-owned graphic novel.

In 2009, Thomas relocated to Seoul, South Korea, at the request of Korean animation studio JM Animation to be hired in-house as part of the animation production staff. He was later hired as in-house storyboard/animation production artist at Studio Mir for work on The Legend of Korra for Nickelodeon. Soon after, Moi Animation studio looked to hire him as a producer and director on several other independent projects, marking him as the first American animator to be hired to work in-house as permanent, independent production staff for animation studios in South Korea. His exploits in the Korean animation industry were recorded and featured in a web-documentary he produced and directed called Seoul Sessions, presented by filmmakers Coodie & Chike's Creative Control TV, an online TV network that features coverage of talents in music, fashion and the arts. Thomas was later invited to speak at the 5th annual TEDx in Incheon, South Korea, where he spoke about his journey and the importance of "Successful Failures". In 2011, Thomas was tapped to work on Black Dynamite for Adult Swim. He served as creative producer and supervising director for Season 1 and supervising director in Season 2.

In November 2014, Thomas successfully crowd-funded an animated TV series pilot called Cannon Busters: The Animated Series, based on his creator-owned comic book of the same name, featuring production by Japanese anime studio Satelight. The project was successfully funded in December 2014 and was released to limited audiences July 8, 2016. In October, Thomas partnered with Crunchyroll for an exclusive deal to co-produce his original anime creation Children of Ether, released in 300 theaters, July 26 as part of Crunchyroll's Anime Movie Night event. It was released on-platform shortly afterwards.

In August 2017, it was announced that Cannon Busters was acquired by streaming giant Netflix to be co-produced by  Satelight and Japanese anime studio Yumeta Company as a 12-episode mini-series and was originally set for a March 2019 release. In July 2019, it was announced at Anime Expo that Cannon Busters was confirmed for a launch on the streaming service in August 2019.

On November 8, 2018, Netflix announced Yasuke, an anime original fantasy series created, directed and executive-produced by Thomas, which is inspired by the historical African samurai Yasuke who served Oda Nobunaga in the late 1500s, featuring Oscar-nominated actor Lakeith Stanfield (Atlanta, Get Out, Sorry to Bother You and Knives Out) as the lead voice of Yasuke and served as an executive producer alongside Grammy Award-winning artist, Flying Lotus, who produced the music as well and also served as an executive producer. Animation production was handled by Japanese animation house, MAPPA. Yasuke was released on April 29, 2021. 

On November 17, 2021, Netflix's Yasuke was nominated for Best Main Title in the TV show/ Limited Series Category at the 12th Hollywood Music in Media Awards. 

On January 19, 2022, Netflix's Yasuke was nominated for Outstanding Animated Series for the 53rd NAACP Image Awards.
[25]

References

External links

Netflix Cannon Busters Site

Press
Seoul Sessions web-docu on Creative Control TV
Failing your way to success: LeSean Thomas at TEDxSinchon presentation
Forbes Cannon Busters Review
Crunchyroll & LeSean Thomas Join Forces for Children of Ether
Children of Ether Forbes Article
Netflix Acquires Cannon Busters series for 2018
Netflix Acquires Cannon Busters, Saint Seya & more, Variety Magazine
IGN Anime Club: Creating Anime
Netflix's 'Cannon busters' Adaptation Sets Release Date
EW on Netflix's 'Yasuke' Anime 2021 Release Announcement
TimeOut on Netflix's 'Yasuke' Anime April 29, 2021 Premiere Announcement

American animators
American comics artists
American comics writers
American storyboard artists
African-American television directors
American television producers
American animated film directors
American animated film producers
DC Comics people
Living people
1975 births
People from the Bronx
American expatriates in Japan
American television directors
African-American television producers
African-American film producers
African-American film directors
African-American comics creators
American expatriates in South Korea
21st-century African-American people
20th-century African-American people